EVP may refer to:

Political parties 
 Estonian Left Party
 Evangelical People's Party (Netherlands), defunct
 Evangelical People's Party of Switzerland

Other uses
 Earned Value Professional, a designation for cost engineers created by AACE International
 Eigen value problem
 Electronic voice phenomenon
 Employee value proposition
 Employee volunteering programme; see Volunteering § Corporate volunteering
 Enhanced Virus Protection, of AMD processors
 Executive Vice President